Utah v. Evans, 536 U.S. 452 (2002), was a United States Supreme Court case holding that the use of certain statistical techniques in the United States Census does not violate 13 USC §195 or the Census Clause of the Constitution.

In instances where the Census Bureau remained unsure of the number of residents at an address after a field visit, the Bureau inferred its population characteristics with statistics taken from its nearest similar neighbor, a practice called "hot-deck imputation." The use of hot-deck imputation in the 2000 Census increased the population of North Carolina 0.4% and Utah by 0.2%. Due to the practice, during the reapportionment of the US House of Representatives Utah received one less seat and North Carolina gained a seat. Utah sought an injunction requiring the Bureau to revise the published census results to those without the use of imputation. North Carolina, which stood to lose a Representative under such an injunction, intervened in the case, disputing Utah's standing to sue. The Utah federal district court refused to grant the State's injunction ruling in favor of the Census Bureau.

Appealing the ruling to the Supreme Court, Utah argued that the Bureau's use of imputation violated 13 U.S.C. §195, which prohibits use of 'sampling' for apportioning Representatives among states. It further argued that imputation did not satisfy the United States Constitution's requirement of an "actual enumeration" for the purpose of apportioning Representatives. In an 8–1 ruling, the Supreme Court rejected Utah's arguments and affirmed the district court's opinion. In the majority opinion Justice Breyer reasoned that hot-deck imputation did not constitute sampling, which attempts to extrapolate statistics about a large population from the statistics of a smaller one, rather it attempts to account for missing individuals by comparing across populations. Furthermore, the Census Clause of the Constitution was not violated as the actual enumeration needs to be conducted "in such Manner as" Congress itself "shall by Law direct," which wording which does not forbid the use of statistical methods to improve accuracy.

See also
List of United States Supreme Court cases, volume 536
List of United States Supreme Court cases

External links
 

United States Supreme Court cases
United States electoral redistricting case law
2002 in United States case law
United States Census Bureau
Congressional districts of Utah
United States Supreme Court cases of the Rehnquist Court